Capital punishment in Malaysia is a legal penalty in Malaysian law. 

Malaysia holds 33 capital crimes, including murder, drug trafficking, treason, acts of terrorism, waging war against the Yang di-Pertuan Agong, and, since 2003, rape resulting in death or rape of a child. Executions are carried out by hanging and firing squad.

However, with ongoing discussions to repeal the death penalty as a mandatory sentence, such as a bill tabled by the previous Malaysian government in October 2018, these serious crimes may only face the possibility of the death penalty in a High Court sentencing. In October 2018, the government had also imposed a moratorium on all executions until the death penalty is abolished.

On 10 December 2019, the Law Minister had announced that an anticipated proposal on alternatives to the death penalty will be submitted in January 2020, allowing judges a discretion in certain serious crimes. On 10 June 2022, the practice of mandatory capital punishment was formally abolished, with capital punishment being under the discretion of a judge.

History
The idea behind capital punishment in Malaysia arose from a mix between the common law system that Malaysia inherited during their period of British colonisation, as British Malaya, and the authorisation of capital punishment in Islam. Death penalties are carried out in Malaysia by hanging and the penalty is mandatory in 12 offences and possible in 33.

In 2016, Malaysia carried out nine executions, imposed 36 death sentences, and two death sentences were commuted. Malaysia was also reported to have 1,042 death row inmates, including 413 foreign nationals. According to the World Coalition Against the Death Penalty, Malaysia carried out four executions in 2017.

On 10 October 2018, Liew Vui Keong, the minister in charge of law in the Prime Minister's Department, announced that the Malaysian Government would abolish the death penalty. A proposed bill is expected to be tabled at the next sitting of Parliament. The minister also announced that the Government had imposed a moratorium on all executions until the passage of the new law. The current Pakatan Harapan government had campaigned on reviewing capital punishment and other "unsuitable" national security laws during the 2018 Malaysian general election. The Government's announcement to abolish capital punishment was welcomed by Kumi Naidoo, Amnesty International's Secretary General, who called on the Malaysian Parliament to consign the death penalty to the history books. In contrast, multiple groups and people have come out against the abolition of the death penalty, including non-governmental Malay dominance organization, Perkasa.

In March 2019, the government announced its decision to retain the death penalty, although it was announced that, despite the death penalty being retained as an official punishment in Malaysia, it will no longer be used as a mandatory punishment.

On 13 July 2019, Minister in Prime Minister's Department Datuk Liew Vui Keong disclosed that a Bill to abolish mandatory death penalty is expected to be tabled in Parliament in October once the government decides on appropriate prison terms for 11 serious crime it covers.

Statutory provisions 
The following is a list of the criminal offences that carry the death penalty:
 Waging or attempting to wage war or abetting the waging of war against the Yang di-Pertuan Agong, a Ruler or Yang di-Pertua Negeri – Section 121 Penal Code (see: Al-Ma'unah)
 Offences against the person of the Yang di-Pertuan Agong, Ruler or Yang di-Pertua Negeri – Section 121A Penal Code
 Committing terrorist acts – Section 130C Penal Code
 Abetment of mutiny within Malaysian Armed Forces, if mutiny is committed in consequence thereof – Section 132 Penal Code
 Murder – Section 302 Penal Code (mandatory) (see: Mona Fandey)
 Abetment of suicide of child or insane person – Section 305 Penal Code
 Attempt to murder while under a life sentence– Section 307(2) Penal Code
 Kidnapping or abducting in order to murder – Section 364 Penal Code
 Hostage-taking resulting in death – Section 374A Penal Code (see: Pudu Prison siege)
 Rape resulting in death – Section 376(4) Penal Code
 Gang-robbery with murder – Section 396 Penal Code
 Trafficking in dangerous drugs – Section 39B Dangerous Drugs Act 1952 (see: Barlow and Chambers execution)
 Discharging a firearm in the commission of a scheduled offence – Section 3 Firearms (Increased Penalties) Act 1971
 Being an accomplice in case of discharge of firearm – Section 3A Firearms (Increased Penalties) Act 1971
 Offences in security areas for possession of firearm, ammunition and explosives – Section 57(1) Internal Security Act 1960 (see: Botak Chin)
 Consorting with person carrying or having possession of arms or explosives in security areas – Section 58(1) Internal Security Act 1960
 Abduction, wrongful restraint or wrongful confinement for ransom – Section 3(1) Kidnapping Act 1961

Only High Courts had jurisdiction in capital cases. Appeals to the Court of Appeal and the Federal Court are automatic. The last resort for the convicted is to plead pardon for clemency. Pardons or clemency were granted by the Ruler or Yang di-Pertua Negeri (Governor) of the state where the crime was committed or the Yang di-Pertuan Agong if the crime was committed in the Federal Territories or when involving members of the armed forces. Death sentences were carried out by hanging as provided in Section 277 of the Criminal Procedure Code.

Pregnant women and minors may not be sentenced to death. In lieu of the death penalty, women pregnant at the time of sentencing would have their sentences reduced to life imprisonment as provided by Section 275 of the Criminal Procedure Code, while juvenile offenders would be detained at the pleasure of the Ruler, Governor or Yang di-Pertuan Agong depending on where the crime was committed as provided by the Child Act 2001.

Dangerous Drugs Act
The death penalty for drug trafficking was made mandatory in 1983. The main reason for this was because drug trafficking was seen as one of the national challenges of the country. Since then, there has been a relaxation on this rule as death penalties may sometimes be substituted with a lighter sentence which includes mandatory whippings, forced rehabilitation or preventive detention.

The presumption is that a person would be considered to be trafficking drugs if they were in possession of a certain amount of dangerous drugs. Under section 39B of the Dangerous Drugs Act, those in possession of 15 g or more heroin and morphine; 1,000 g or more opium (raw or prepared); 200 g or more cannabis; and 40 g or more cocaine will receive the mandatory death sentence. The courts have affirmed that to establish prima facie drug trafficking, it has to be shown that the accused party was in actual possession of the drug and that the person has to have knowledge that they were in possession of the dangerous drug. Once the death sentence has been passed, the sentence shall be passed on to the chief minister of the state where the judgment was given where a note about the evidence used in the case and a report about the judges opinion of the sentence would be included. The minister then has a choice of either fixing a time and place for the execution to be carried out or may substitute in a lesser punishment if the minister wishes.

The courts though have noted the severity of the sentence and in several instances have tried to impose a lower sentence where possible. One of the methods employed by the court would be to ensure that the procedures set out for the sentence have been strictly adhered to by the prosecution. The court in that case paid close attention to the evidence presented to ensure that the judgment made was the right one. The court has also acquitted a person when the reported amount of drugs seized was only slightly different from the amount of drugs received by the forensics lab chemist. The difference in amount was 10.21 grams.

There have also been suggestions by those in the executive for a re-appeal of the death sentence for drug trafficking. The Law Minister in 2012 held that the government may replace the death sentence with an imprisonment term instead in recognition that such a sentence only punishes the drug mules and not those higher up in the chain. There was also the fact that the death penalty does not seem to have the deterring effect that such a penalty was hoped to create, thus questioning the need for the penalty for that particular offence.

Public opinion and calls for abolition
The abolition of the death penalty has started to gain momentum in Malaysia. The government has started to consider more humane ways to "uphold the justice for the people." The public are not as unsupportive for the abolishment of the death penalty as imagined. It was found that although a substantive portion of the public would agree for the death penalty in cases of murder, drug trafficking or firearms offences, this number took a considerable drop once the participants were told about the various scenarios which merited capital punishment as defined in the relevant statute.

An overwhelming 82 per cent of Malaysians opposed the government's move to axe the death penalty, as polled by Berita Harian Online, Harian Metro and the New Straits Times Online.

Universal Periodic Review 2009
Malaysia has been reviewed twice by the United Nations Human Rights Council under the Universal Periodic Review (UPR). First in 2009 and the other in 2013. In 2009, Malaysia reported in their national report that the death sentence was only imposed on the most serious crimes and was in line with Article 6 of the ICCPR. They also held that there were several safeguards in place in the legal system that have to be met before a death penalty can be passed.
Of the various non-governmental organisations that made a submission for the review, three had an extract about the death penalty. The first was the Human Rights Commission of Malaysia (SUHAKAM). In their report, they noted that they were against the death penalty and natural life sentences and recommended that such cases be reviewed by the Pardon Board. Amnesty International reported that although such a heavy punishment was being carried out, very little information about execution itself was actually made public. This included when the punishment was set to be carried out, the person being punished and who had been executed.

It appeared in the same report that according to 'Malaysians Against Death Penalty' there were a total of 300 inmates on death row in prison in January 2008. Most of them were for drug related offences. The Coalition of Malaysian NGOs in the UPR Process stated that they took the same stance as Amnesty International and noted that the death penalty went against the Convention Against Torture and Other Cruel, Inhuman or Degrading Treatment or Punishment.
As for the Working Groups report, several nations including France, Djibouti, Egypt and Sudan recommended for a range of actions to be taken against the death penalty. This included suggestions of outright abolition to ratifying the ICCPR and applying the relevant standards when the death penalty was imposed. Malaysia re-affirmed their position on the matter and stated that the death penalty was only applied in the most severe cases. However, they noted that they were at the time attempting to remove the death penalty and caning of those below the age of 18 through an amendment of the Essential (Security Cases) Regulations 1975 and at the same time, would consider a reduction in offences which carry the death penalty in a step towards the abolition of the death penalty outright.

Universal Periodic Review 2013
In its national report, Malaysia re-iterated its statement made in the 2009 Periodic Review. They added though that there has recently been discussion with the public about the possibility of abolishment of the death penalty. They also noted that a study has been undertaken to reform the criminal justice in which included offences with a death penalty upon conviction.
Amnesty International prepared another report for submission for the 2013 Universal Periodic Review. With regards about their submission to the death penalty in 2009, the organisation reported that none of the past recommendations have been implemented yet and reported that currently, there were a total of 930 inmates on death row. The Child Rights Information Network reported that the death penalty was still in force in Malaysia which allowed for the death penalty sentence to be passed under Article 97 of the Child Act 2001. The report submitted Joint Submission number 8 reported that convictions under s302 of the Penal code for murder still occurs in Malaysia.

The report noted that Malaysia's approach to drug offences violated international standards. They further noted that there was a serious lack of due process given that those accused of drug trafficking are presumed guilty upon arrest. The organisation argued that as a result of these presumptions, it has led to hundreds of death sentences and executions. They next reported that for treason which was punishable by death, at least 4 people were executed because of it in 2007.
In the working group's report, several nations commented on the fact that Malaysia still has the death penalty and suggested that the death penalty be abolished or that a moratorium on the death penalty be recognised. Some of the nations that recommended this included Spain, Switzerland, Argentina, Belgium, Costa Rica and Kazakhstan. Malaysia responded with a statement that they would keep their options open and continue to engage the public on this subject. They would also look into alternatives to the death penalty. Malaysia pledged that it would complete its review on the moratorium of the death penalty with the intent to abolish it at a later date.

Notable cases 
 Barlow and Chambers execution, the first two Westerners hanged in independent Malaysia on 7 July 1986.
 Derrick Gregory, a British labourer who was executed on 21 July 1989 by hanging, for drug trafficking offences.
 Michael McAuliffe, Australian drug smuggler and barman executed in 1993.
 40-year-old Ahmad Najib Aris, a former aircraft cleaning supervisor who was executed on 23 September 2016, by hanging for murdering IT consultant Canny Ong.
 Brothers Ramesh and Sasivarnam Jayakumar along with Gunasegar Pitchaymuthu were convicted of murder and executed on 25 March 2016 by hanging. This execution was conducted in secret, and their families were only given two days notice before the men were hanged.
 Maria Elvira Pinto Exposto, an Australian, was arrested in December 2014 in Kuala-Lumpur Airport while in transit and was found to be in possession of 1.1 kg of crystal methamphetamine. She faced a mandatory death penalty, was acquitted by the court, but the prosecutors appealed. The appeal court vacated the acquittal decision, and in May 2018 she was sentenced to death. On 26 November 2019, the Malaysian High Court acquitted her and ordered an immediate release.
 Sangeeta Sharma Brahmacharimayum, an Indian beautician sentenced to death for smuggling 1,637.1g of methamphetamine in October 2016.
Muhammad Lukman, whose death sentence for distributing Cannabis extract for medical purposes sparked public outcry and led to a national review of both the Death Penalty and drug laws
Mona Fandey, a Malaysian actress, murderer and witchcraft supporter. She was executed next to her husband and with another accomplice.
Botak Chin, a Malaysian criminal and gangster who was convicted of possession of firearms and armed robbery, and he was sentenced to death for the capital crime of possessing firearms. He was hanged on 11 June 1981, at the age of 30.
Sunny Ang, a Singaporean who murdered his girlfriend Jenny Cheok during a scuba diving trip in the waters of Sisters' Islands, Singapore in August 1963 when Singapore was still a part of Malaysia. The crime shocked both Singapore and Malaysia as the first case of murder without a body in both countries, and Ang was subsequently convicted and sentenced to death by the High Court of Singapore for murder in May 1965 solely based on circumstantial evidence and without Cheok's body. Ang was eventually hanged in Singapore's Changi Prison on 6 February 1967 (at the time of the execution, Singapore has separated from Malaysia since 9 August 1965 – three months after the end of Ang's trial).
Tan Kheng Ann and another 17 members out of the 58 detainees charged with killing four prison officers during the Pulau Senang prison riots on 12 July 1963. These 18 men were found guilty of murder in March 1964 by the High Court of Singapore in the largest trial ever held in both Singapore and Malaysia, and a year later, on 29 October 1965, two months and twenty days after Singapore separated from Malaysia, the 18 men were hanged at Singapore's Changi Prison.
 Lorraine and Aaron Cohen were two New Zealander drug smugglers sentenced to death in Malaysia in the mid 80s. Their sentences were later reduced and they were sent back to New Zealand.
 American woman Brenda Ferguson was arrested in 1994 for smuggling drugs into the country. She was sentenced to death and her sentence was reduced a year later.

See also 

 Crime in Malaysia
 Law of Malaysia

References

 
Murder in Malaysia